The Collection is Sonata Arctica's second compilation album. It was released on 15 November 2006 by Spinefarm Records.

Track listing

Track listing: CD 2 (UK special edition)

Personnel
 Tony Kakko – vocals, keyboards
 Jani Liimatainen – guitars
 Marko Paasikoski − bass guitar
 Henrik Klingenberg – keyboards
 Tommy Portimo − drums

Certifications

References

2006 compilation albums
Spinefarm Records albums
Sonata Arctica albums